Litorisediminicola is a Gram-negative, aerobic and non-spore-forming genus of bacteria from the family of Rhodobacteraceae with one known species (Litorisediminicola beolgyonensis). Litorisediminicola beolgyonensis has been isolated from coastal sediments from Korea.

References

Rhodobacteraceae
Bacteria genera
Monotypic bacteria genera